Musaabad (also Romanized as Mūsáābād; also known as Bālā Deh) is a village in Solgi Rural District, Khezel District, Nahavand County, Hamadan Province, Iran. At the 2006 census, its population was 204, in 46 families.

References 

Populated places in Nahavand County